Old Town is a village in Calderdale, West Yorkshire, England. It is situated on a hilltop above Hebden Bridge and across the Hebden valley from Heptonstall. The village falls within the Calderdale Ward of Luddendenfoot. Both Old Town and nearby Pecket Well are served by Wadsworth Parish Council. Old Town has a village green, two chapels, a pub called the Hare & Hounds (known by the locals as Lane Ends) and a post office which has a café situated within. The village has a population of about 1,070.

Famous people
Stuart Fielden, Great Britain rugby league player

References

External links

Villages in West Yorkshire
Geography of Calderdale